William Baker Faville (1866-1946) was an American architect.

He was born in California, did some growing up in western New York State, studied Massachusetts Institute of Technology. 
He met Walter Danforth Bliss, with whom he later partnered, and they both then worked for McKim, Mead & White.  He returned to the west coast and stayed.

A number of his works are listed on the National Register of Historic Places (NRHP).

Works he is associated with include:
San Rafael Improvement Club, 1800 5th Ave., San Rafael, CA, designed to serve as the Victrola Pavilion in the 1915 San Francisco exposition, relocated and repurposed in 1916.  NRHP-listed.
Oakland Hotel, 260 13th St., Oakland, CA, (Bliss & Faville), NRHP-listed
Oakland Public Library (1900–01), 659 14th St., Oakland, CA, (Bliss & Faville), NRHP-listed
Rialto Building, 116 New Montgomery St., San Francisco, CA (Bliss and Faville), NRHP-listed
Southern Pacific Railroad Company's Sacramento Depot, 5th and I Sts., Sacramento, CA (Bliss & Faville), NRHP-listed
US Post Office-Willows Main, 315 W. Sycamore St., Willows, CA (Faville, William B.), NRHP-listed
Woman's Athletic Club of San Francisco, 640 Sutter St., San Francisco, CA (Faville, William B.), NRHP-listed
The second Saint Francis Hotel (1902 to 1904), 301-345 Powell Street on Union Square in San Francisco, destroyed in 1906 earthquake
The third Saint Francis Hotel (1906).

References

1866 births
1946 deaths
Architects from California
Massachusetts Institute of Technology alumni
20th-century American architects